Girolamo Bernardino Pallantieri (20 May 1533 – 23 August 1619) was a Roman Catholic prelate who served as Bishop of Bitonto (1603–1619).

Biography
Girolamo Bernardino Pallantieri was born in a Castel Bolognese, Italy on 20 May 1533 and ordained a friar in the Order of Friars Minor Conventual. On 10 September 1603, he was appointed during the papacy of Pope Gregory XIII as Bishop of Bitonto. On 12 October 1603, he was consecrated bishop by Girolamo Bernerio, Cardinal-Bishop of Albano, with Giulio Santuccio, Bishop of Sant'Agata de' Goti, and Hippolytus Manari, Bishop of Montepeloso, serving as co-consecrators. He served as Bishop of Bitonto until his death on 23 August 1619. While bishop, he was the principal co-consecrator of Vittorio Ragazzoni, Archbishop of Zadar (1604) and Giuseppe Saluzzo, Bishop of Ruvo (1604).

References

External links and additional sources
 (for Chronology of Bishops)
 (for Chronology of Bishops)

17th-century Italian Roman Catholic bishops
Bishops appointed by Pope Clement VIII
1533 births
1619 deaths
Conventual Friars Minor
Conventual Franciscan bishops
Bishops of Bitonto